Bergenfest (initiated 1993 in Bergen, Norway under the name OleBlues) started out as an intimate blues and Americana festival, situated at various venues in the city center of Bergen.

Biography 
Bergenfest has since then grown into what is now one of the leading music events in Norway, with a much more diverse music profile and a significantly bigger audience. In 2012, the festival changed to an outdoor event, and are now situated in the historically and aesthetically stimulating surroundings at Bergenhus Fortress.

Bands and artists

2011–2015 

2011 (April 27 – May 1)
 Alela Diane
 Cortney Tidwell
 Dave Cloud & The Lounge Lizards
 Emmylou Harris
 Giant Sand
 Ida Jenshus
 Imelda May
 Jason Isbell
 Josh T. Pearson
 Kelly Joe Phelps & Corinne West
 Kurt Wagner
 Lloyd Cole
 Los Lobos
 Miss Tati
 Los Lonely Boys
 Otis Gibbs
 Phantom Limb
 Ron Sexsmith
 These United States
 Vidar Busk

2012 (June 21 – 24)
 Ane Brun
 Bat for Lashes
 Baxter Dury
 Bernhoft with band
 Billy Talent
 Chew Lips
 Doomriders
 Flogging Molly
 Ingrid Michaelson
 Israel Nash Gripka
 JD McPherson
 Jonathan Wilson
 Justin Townes Earle
 Monica Heldal
 Patti Smith & her band
 Phenomenal Handclap Band
 Treetop Flyers
 Trixie Whitley
 Turboneger

2013 (June 12 – 15)
 Amy Macdonald
 Band of Horses
 Biffy Clyro
 CC Cowboys
 Charles Bradley
 Dan Croll
 Dig Deeper
 Gerilja
 Hoffmaestro
 Imagine Dragons
 Mark Knopfler
 Mikhael Paskalev
 Nick Cave & The Bad Seeds
 Noah and the Whale
 Razika
 Real Ones
 Simone Felice
 Susanne Sundfør
 Tønes

2014 (June 11 – 14)
 Agnes Obel
 Anne Grete Preus
 Audrey Horne
 Billy Bragg
 Blondie
 Frank Turner
 Highasakite
 John Mayer
 Lana Del Rey
 Laura Mvula
 Lars Vaular
 Monica Heldal
 Robert Plant
 Rhye
 Simple Minds
 Sivert Høyem
 Skambankt
 Thomas Dybdahl
 ZZ Top

2015 (June 11 – 14)
 Patti Smith
 Jaga Jazzist
 Jackson Browne
 Ben Howard
 Bastille
 John Grant
 Calexico
 Siri Nilsen
 Kygo
 Tori Amos
 Aurora
 Alt-J
 Kyla La Grange
 Miss Tati
 Thea Hjelmeland
 First Aid Kit
 Natalie Prass
 Team Me
 Kyla La Grange
 Seinabo Sey

2016 
June 15

Biffy Clyro
Band Of Horses
Michael Kiwanuka
Yeasayer
Vintage Trouble
Patty Griffin
Israel Nash
The London Souls

June 16

Sigur Rós
Ghost
Wilco
Wolf Alice
Mercury Rev
Banditos
Blackfoot Gypsies
Nothing but Thieves
MK's Marvellous Medicine

June 17

John Newman
Jake Bugg
Sivert Høyem
Lars Vaular
Yelawolf
Rudimental
Coasts
Ezra Furman
Model Aeroplanes
Half Moon Run
Ibibio Sound Machine

June 18

Highasakite
Låpsley
Years & Years
Lukas Graham
Action Bronson
Astrid S
dePresno
Great News
Alibiet
Lemaitre
Milky Chance
Cast
Sonny Alven
Chain Wallet
Pompel & The Pilts
Deborah Rose and Mari Randle
Leftover Cuties

2017
June 14, 2017

June 15, 2017

June 16, 2017

June 17, 2017

2018

Nick Cave & the bad Seeds
Queens of the Stone Age
Alex Cameron
Anna of the North
Anderson East
Angus & Julia Stone
Astrid S
Audrey Horne
Bendik
Cezinando
Cloves
Colter Wall
Cordovas
Electric Eye
Erlend Ropstad
Father John Misty
Fieh
Gabrielle
George Ezra
Gospelbeach
Great News
Halie
Hollow Hearts
I See Rivers
J Hus
James Bay
Janove
Jarle Skavhellen
Jason Isbell and The 400 Unit
Jessie Reyez
John Moreland
Keeva
Kelela
Kiriyama Family
Kjartan Lauritzen
Krakow
Little Simz
Lloyd Llewellyn
Lukas Graham
MachoMayne
Mahalia
Mato Polo
Mikaela Davis
Myra
Nick Mulvey
Pale Waves
Parcels
Phoenix
Real Ones
Rival Sons
Roy Woods
Shikoswe
Sigrid
Sleaford Mods
Sløtface
Sondre Justad
Sparks
Super-G
SYML
Tank and the Bangas
Thåström
The Districts
The Last Internationale
The Struts
Tom Grennan
Tom Russell
Whitney Rose
Vasas Flora och Fauna
Velázquez México

2019

Bon Iver
Robert Plant & the Sensational Space Shifters
Clean Bandit
Hjerteslag
Madrugada
Patti Smith
Tove Lo
Unge Ferrari
Years & Years
Alma
Angelo Reira
Barns Courtney
Benjamin Francis Leftwich
Benjamin Ingrosso
Bishat
Black Midi
Cautious Clay
Charlie Cunningham
Daniel Romano
Depresno
Dean Lewis
Emma Steinbakken
Gavin James
Girson & Venner
Hester V75
I See Rivers
Iris
Isah
Isah + Angelo Reira + SAUS
Jacob Banks
Jarle Skavhellen
John Grant
Juke Ross
Julia Holter
Jungle
Kristian Kristensen
Kurt Vile & the Violators
Lee Fields & the Expressions
Moyka
Novo Amor
Phlake
Pom Poko
Razika
Romskip
Ruel
Ryan Bingham
SAUS
Snail Mail
Starcrawler
Stephen Malkmus and the Jicks
Sushi x Kobe
The Charlatans
The Tallest Man on Earth
The Twilight Sad
Tom Walker
Vilnes
Yola

2022
Tuesday, 14 July

Grace Jones
Michael Kiwanuka
Bernhoft
Charlotte Jane
Gary Clark Jr.
Tide Lines
Ziggy Marley: A Live Tribute to His Father

Wednesday, 15 July

A-ha
Inhaler
Passenger
Rhys Lewis
Rolling Blackouts Coastal Fever
S.G. Goodman
Sondre Lerche
The Specials

Thursday, 16 July

Biffy Clyro
Aurora
Gang of Youths
Joan As Police Woman
Kvelertak
Slomosa
Sports Team
Supergrass

Friday, 17 July

Cezinando
Emilie Nicolas
Karpe
Zara Larsson
Billy Nomates
Black Pumas
Fay Wildhagen
Hannah Storm
Kamara
Nelly Moar
Two Door Cinema Club
Victor Leksell

Saturday, 18 July

Röyksopp
Arif
Astrid S
Erlend Øye
George Ezra
IAMDDB
Iris Gold
Justin Adams & Mohamed Errebbaa
KA2
Michelle Ullestad
Myra
Sam Ryder
Tom Grennan
Victoria Nadine
Zupermaria

References

External links 
 

Festivals in Bergen
Music festivals in Norway
Cultural festivals in Norway
Music in Bergen
1993 establishments in Norway
Culture in Hordaland
Music festivals established in 1993
Blues festivals in Norway
Folk festivals in Norway
Summer events in Norway